Larry Thomas (April 13, 1936 – January 25, 1965) was a NASCAR Grand National Series driver from Thomasville, North Carolina. Thomas died in a non-racing related car crash during the start of the 1965 NASCAR season.

Driving career
Larry Thomas began his racing career in 1956 driving hobby stocks and modifieds at Bowman-Gray Stadium. He began his NASCAR career in 1961 driving for Wade Younts. His best finish was seventh at South Boston Speedway. During the 1962 season, Thomas encountered a significant number of mechanical failures which marred him in seventeenth place in the standings. His 1963 campaign did not fare much better as he ended up twenty-second in the point standings. 1964 was Thomas' breakout season. Though he still suffered quite a few mechanical failures throughout the season, he finished eighth in the final point standings and earned a career-best second-place finish at Hickory Speedway. Also in 1964, Thomas was involved in a significant wreck at Jacksonville Speedway when he flipped over the Younts' owned Dodge. Thomas escaped without serious injury.

Death
Getting ready for the 1965 season, Thomas was driving to a tire test when he drove off Interstate 75 in Georgia and landed in a thirty-five foot embankment killing him instantly.

References

External links
 
Career Stats

1936 births
1965 deaths
NASCAR drivers
People from Thomasville, North Carolina
Racing drivers from North Carolina
Road incident deaths in Georgia (U.S. state)